The 2009 Acura Sports Car Challenge of Mid-Ohio was the sixth round of the 2009 American Le Mans Series season.  It took place at the Mid-Ohio Sports Car Course, Lexington, Ohio on August 8, 2009.  Gil de Ferran and Simon Pagenaud won their fourth consecutive race, beating the Highcroft Racing Acura by 8.3 seconds.  After losing out at the previous round at Lime Rock Park, Fernández Racing Acura won the LMP2 category for the fifth time this season, ahead of class newcomer Team Cytosport's Porsche RS Spyder.  Flying Lizard Motorsports also continued their winning streak by claiming the GT2 class victory, beating the debuting revamped Corvette Racing Corvette C6.R.  Martin and Melanie Snow won the ALMS Challenge class by a gap of two laps over the second place Orbit Racing Porsche.

Report

Qualifying
Gil de Ferran, driving the car of his own team, claimed pole position for Mid-Ohio by outpacing David Brabham's Highcroft car by less than .07 seconds.  Acura also led the LMP2 category with Fernández Racing leading the two Dyson Racing Team entries.  Jörg Bergmeister led Flying Lizard Motorsports to the top of the GT2 category, ahead of Jaime Melo's Risi Ferrari.  Professional driver Guy Cosmo put the Orbit Racing Porsche on pole within the Challenge class.

Qualifying result
Pole position winners in each class are marked in bold.

Race

Race result
Class winners are marked in bold. Cars failing to complete 70% of winner's distance marked as Not Classified (NC).

References

Mid-Ohio
Sports Car Challenge of Mid-Ohio
2009 in sports in Ohio